The Divinity of Purpose is the sixth studio album by American metalcore band Hatebreed. The album was released in North America on January 29, 2013, through Razor & Tie and in Europe on January 25, 2013, through Nuclear Blast Records. The album was co-produced by Hatebreed, Zeuss and Josh Wilbur. According to band frontman Jamey Jasta, the album will be "all pit, no shit." On November 12, 2012, the group debuted a track from the album titled "Put It to the Torch" on YouTube.

The Divinity of Purpose debuted at a career high No. 20 position on the Billboard 200 with over 17,400 copies sold in its first week.  It has sold 55,000 copies in the US as of April 2016.

Reception 

The aggregate review site Metacritic assigned an average score of 75 to the album based on 5 reviews, indicating "generally favorable reviews".

In a positive review by AllMusic's James Christopher Monger, the reviewer characterized the record as "Meatier and more hardcore-centric than their last offering". Chad Bower of About.com commented positively on the album's quality of content as well stating "Jamey Jasta and company blaze through the 12 tracks on The Divinity of Purpose in under 40 minutes, with nary an ounce of filler".

In another positive review on Metalholic, Sairaj R. Kamath called the album, "one loud, charged-up, headstrong message of positive reinforcement, with such songs like "Own Your World," "Nothing Scars Me" and others having enough gusto to cure worldwide depression".

In a mixed review of the album on CraveOnline, Iann Robinson commented on the albums repetition, stating "there is little variation from song to song but the intensity and drive help save Hatebreed from falling into parody like so many of their peers".

Track listing

Personnel 
Hatebreed
 Jamey Jasta – vocals
 Chris Beattie – bass guitar
 Wayne Lozinak – lead guitar
 Matt Byrne – drums
 Frank Novinec – rhythm guitar

Production
 Zeuss – record producer
 Josh Wilbur – record producer, audio mixing

Charts

References

External links 
 Official website
 
 
 

2013 albums
Hatebreed albums
Albums with cover art by Eliran Kantor
Razor & Tie albums
Albums produced by Chris "Zeuss" Harris